"Bezerk" is a single by American rapper Big Sean featuring American rapper ASAP Ferg and American record producer Hit-Boy. It was released on August 26, 2019 as a standalone single. The song was produced by Hit-Boy, with additional production by DJ Corbett and G-Dav.

Background and composition 
Hours after the song was released, it was premiered by Big Sean and ASAP Ferg at the MTV Video Music Awards. A snippet of the music video was also teased on Twitter by Sean on the same day.

On a "bouncy, 808-heavy" beat produced by Hit-Boy, the rappers bring great energy and rap about a variety of topics, including designer clothing, relationships with women and God-given abilities; Ferg talks about "moving product" in his youth. The two also "trade bars" about their haters.

Music video 
The music video for the song was directed by Mike Carson and the two rappers, and premiered on September 26, 2019. It starts off with the rappers buying snacks at a liquor store. Big Sean buys an Arizona ice tea, which ASAP Ferg warns will lower sperm count. As they debate, a young girl approaches them and throws a grenade at them, seemingly transporting Sean and Ferg to an alternate universe, where they run through a neighborhood and are chased by children. They even become airborne for a while and hang from the top of the Big Ben, now bedazzled in diamonds as a resemblance to Rolex.

Charts

Certifications

References 

2019 singles
2019 songs
Big Sean songs
ASAP Ferg songs
Songs written by Big Sean
Songs written by ASAP Ferg
Songs written by Hit-Boy
Song recordings produced by Hit-Boy
GOOD Music singles
Def Jam Recordings singles
Trap music songs
Songs written by Dustin Corbett